Howard Chandler Christy (January 10, 1872 – March 3, 1952) was an American artist and illustrator. Famous for the "Christy Girl" – a colorful and illustrious successor to the "Gibson Girl" – Christy is also widely known for his iconic WWI military recruitment and Liberty loan posters, along with his 1940 masterpiece titled, Scene at the Signing of the Constitution of the United States, which is installed along the east stairwell of the United States Capitol.

From the 1920s until the early 1950s, Christy was active as a portrait painter whose sitters included presidents, senators, industrialists, movies stars, and socialites. He painted Lt. Col. Theodore Roosevelt, and Presidents Warren G. Harding, Calvin Coolidge, Herbert Hoover, Franklin Delano Roosevelt, and Harry Truman. Other famous people he painted include William Randolph Hearst, the Prince of Wales (Edward VIII), Eddie Rickenbacker, Benito Mussolini, Prince Umberto, and Amelia Earhart.  By 1938, Time magazine proclaimed Christy "the most commercially successful U.S. artist."

Education and influences
Christy was born in Morgan County and attended early school in Duncan Falls, Ohio. He then studied in New York at the Art Students League from 1890 to 1891 and then at the National Academy under William Merritt Chase, first at Chase's summer retreat at Shinnecock, Long Island, and then at his 10th Street Studio.

Early work

Christy first attracted attention with his realistic illustrations and several articles as a combat artist during the Spanish–American War that included the Battle of Las Guasimas, the Battle of El Caney and the Battle of San Juan Hill, published in Scribner's, Harper's, and Leslie's Weekly magazines, and in Collier's Weekly. Christy gained especial prominence with the series, Men of the Army and Navy, and a portrait of Colonel Roosevelt that appeared on the cover of his Rough Riders series published in Scribner's. These illustrations propelled Christy to national prominence.  From this, he decided to turn away from war and painting men in uniform. Instead, he yearned for beauty and created the "Christy Girl", redefining the portrayal of women in America through his illustrations and portraits. He captured the modern American woman – tall, confident, elegant, witty and athletic.

He painted patriotic posters for the US Navy and US Marine Corps. He is also known for his illustrations of the works of such as the well-known war correspondent, Richard Harding Davis.

He illustrated books during this period as well.

National recognition

Having made his reputation for his work as a combat artist and in support of America's World War I effort, Christy soon was illustrating for numerous magazine covers. He became famous for the "Christy Girl", a picturesque and romantic type of society women uniquely his own. His work, whether in watercolor, oils, or pen-and-ink, is characterized by great facility, a dashing but not exaggerated style and a strong sense of values. Together with fellow artists Harrison Fisher and Neysa McMein he constituted the Motion Picture Classic magazine's "Fame and Fortune" contest jury of 1921–22, that discovered the It girl, Clara Bow.

In 1924 Christy painted the official portrait of First Lady Grace Coolidge featuring her white collie Rob Roy, that was hung in the Red Room of the White House and has been displayed in the China Room since the Kennedy administration.

During the Great Depression, Christy found new success as a muralist and painter of historical events.  In 1934 he painted a series of female nudes to decorate the New York City restaurant Café des Artistes. Some of Christy's works, newly cleaned, are on display at The Leopard at des Artistes restaurant, the successor to the Café des Artistes. They include six panels of wood nymphs and paintings such as The Parrot Girl, The Swing Girl, Ponce De Leon, Fall, Spring and the Fountain of Youth.

In 1940, he painted the Scene at the Signing of the Constitution of the United States, which was installed in the House of Representatives wing in the United States Capitol.

Christy's Portrait of Dorothy Barton Thomas is in the Zanesville Museum of Art in Zanesville, Ohio, along with other Christy posters, prints and paintings in their collection. Another of Christy's paintings was displayed at the Gettysburg Museum and Visitor Center. The National Museum of American Illustration in Newport, RI, has a large collection of works by Christy.

A Christy hangs above a desk and typewriter in Jack London's cottage, located in Jack London State Historic Park, Glen Ellen, California.

Personal life

Christy was married twice, both times to women who had modeled for him as one of his "Christy Girls". The first was Maebelle Gertrude Thompson, whom he married on October 15, 1898, shortly after his return from the Spanish–American War.  They had a daughter named Natalie Chandler Christy. They finally divorced in May 1919, after over ten years of periodic separation and bitter divorce and custody battles.

His second marriage was to Nancy Mae (née Coone) Palmer, a widow who had modeled for him for over eight years prior to their marriage.

In the early 1930s, he met Elise Ford who became his model for the murals on Café des Artistes wall. Elise Ford was also Christy's model for the 1941 I Am An American poster personifying America "rushing forward to give the touch of the contagion of liberty and democracy to the rest of the world" in the words of then New York Mayor Fiorello H. La Guardia.  Forty years his junior, she became Christy's companion until his death at age 80. They had a daughter named Holly (Holly Christina Longuski née Holly Ford) born in 1939 while he was painting Scene at the Signing of the Constitution of the United States.

Christy was the cousin of actor Chick Chandler.

Legacy 
Attorney and author James Philip Head wrote a novelistic biography of Christy, The Magic of Youth, published in 2016. It is the first book in a projected trilogy titled An Affair with Beauty - The Mystique of Howard Chandler Christy. Romantic Illusions, the second installment in the trilogy, was released in March 2019.

Helen Frances Copley (1935–2021) documented her research into the life of Christy in her 1999 book "The Christy Quest". Copley's viewing of Christy's painting of Christ "The Coming Peace and Prince of Peace" led her to ten years of research to better understand the man behind the unusual portrayal of Jesus. In 2017, Copley donated her substantial collection of items related to Christy's career as a book and magazine illustrator and the Christy Girl to Laffayette College in Easton, Pennsylvania.

Gallery

Selected publications
Christy, Howard Chandler. The American Girl. New York: Moffat, Yard and Co, 1906. 
Christy, Howard Chandler, and E. Stetson Crawford. The Christy Girl. Indianapolis: The Bobbs-Merrill Co, 1906.

References

Further reading
Copley, Helen F. The Christy Quest. Tucson, Ariz: Patrice Press, 1999.  
Head, James Philip, An Affair with Beauty—The Mystique of Howard Chandler Christy: The Magic of Youth. Minneapolis, MN: North Loop Books, 2016.   
Head, James Philip, An Affair with Beauty—The Mystique of Howard Chandler Christy: Romantic Illusions. Minneapolis, MN: North Loop Books, 2019.  
Schneider, Norris Franz. Howard Chandler Christy. Zanesville, Ohio: Schneider, 1975.

External links

  (as illustrator)
 
 
 Howard Chandler Christy posters at University of North Texas Libraries Digital Collections
 Howard Chandler Christy at American Art Archives – with gallery
 Howard Chandler Christy collection at the National Museum of American Illustration
 The Leopard at des Artistes – successor to the original Hotel Des Artistes (closed 2012)
 An Affair with Beauty: The Mystique of Howard Chandler Christy,  ©2016 James Philip Head
 

1872 births
1952 deaths
American illustrators
19th-century American painters
American male painters
20th-century American painters
People from Morgan County, Ohio
Artists from New Rochelle, New York
American war artists
World War I artists
Painters from Ohio
Members of The Lambs Club
19th-century American male artists
20th-century American male artists